Guilin University, formerly Lijiang College of Guangxi Normal University, is a private university in Guilin, Guangxi. It sits on a 520,000-square-meter campus adjacent to Guangxi Normal University, Yanshan Campus.

Founded in 2001 as an independent college conducted by Guangxi Normal University, it transformed into Guilin University in 2021.

References

Universities and colleges in Guilin
2001 establishments in China
Educational institutions established in 2001